Tomas Birger von Brömssen (born 8 May 1943) is a Swedish actor.

He played leading roles in Albert & Herbert,  My Life as a Dog,  (English title Baltic Sea, Salvation or The Diver), Mannen från Mallorca (English title The Man from Majorca) and Sofies verden (English title Sophie's World).

Together with  Lars-Eric Brossner,  he wrote the 2003 play The Story of the Little Gentleman, based on Barbro Lindgren's  book The Story of the Little Old Man.

He was first married to Eva von Brömssen from 1966 to 2000 (her death). He remarried on 21 November 2004 to the scientist Dorte Velling Pedersen, close friend to his first wife Eva. They currently reside in Frölunda, outside Gothenburg.

Povel Ramel awarded him the Karamelodiktstipendiet prize for Best Male TV Personality in 1986.

References

External links

1943 births
Living people
Actors from Gothenburg
Swedish male film actors
Best Supporting Actor Guldbagge Award winners